{{Infobox military unit
|unit_name=76th Regiment of Foot
|image=DWR 76th Badge (RLH).jpg
|caption=Cap badge of the 76th Regiment of Foot
|dates=1787–1881
|country= (1787–1800) (1801–1881)
|branch=
|type=Line Infantry
|role=
|size= 11 Companies
|command_structure=
|current_commander= Lieutenant Colonel JMD Allardice (1880–1881)
|current_commander_label= Last Commanding Officer
|garrison=Wellesley Barracks, Halifax
|ceremonial_chief= 
|ceremonial_chief_label= Last Colonel-in-Chief
|colonel_of_the_regiment= General Fredrick Darley George CB (1875–1881)
|colonel_of_the_regiment_label= Last Colonel of the Regiment
|nickname=The ImmortalsThe PigsThe Old Seven and Sixpennies|patron=
|motto= none
|colors= Red Facings
|march=Quick: "Scotland the Brave"Slow: "Logie o'Buchan"|mascot= Indian Elephant
|battles=Third Anglo-Mysore WarSecond Anglo-Maratha WarNapoleonic WarsWar of 1812
|notable_commanders=
|anniversaries=
}}

The 76th Regiment of Foot was a British Army regiment, raised in 1787. Under the Childers Reforms it amalgamated with the 33rd (Duke of Wellington's) Regiment to form the Duke of Wellington's Regiment in 1881.

History

Formation
The regiment was raised by Sir Thomas Musgrave, 7th Baronet for service in India as the 76th Regiment of Foot in October 1787. In accordance with the Declaratory Act 1788 the cost of raising the regiment was recharged to East India Company on the basis that the act required that expenses "should be defrayed out of the revenues" arising there. The majority of recruits were raised from Nottingham and Leicestershire, but many of them also came from the Musgrave family estates around Hayton Castle, near Aspatria, Cumbria.

The Royal Warrant for their raising was issued on 12 October 1787 and read:

GEORGE R.Whereas We have thought fit to order a Regt of Foot to beforthwith raised under your Command, which is to consist of tenCompanies, with 3 Sergts, 4 Corpls, 2 Drumrs & 71 private Menin each, with two Fifers to the Grenadier Compy and oneCompy, of 8 Sergts, 8 Corpls, 4 Drumrs & 30 private Men withthe usuals Comd. Officers, these are to authorise you by Beat ofDrum or otherwise to raise so many Men in any Country or partof our Kingdom of Great Britain as shall be wanted to completethe said Regt, to the above mentioned numbers. And all aboveGiven the 12th October. 1787 in the 27th Year of Our Reign.By H.M.'s Command (Sd.) Geo. YongeIndia

The regiment embarked for India in 1788 for service in the Third Anglo-Mysore War and saw action at the Siege of Bangalore in February 1791 and the Siege of Seringapatam in February 1792.Hayden, p. 8–12 The regiment also saw service in the Second Anglo-Maratha War and fought at the Siege of Aligarh in September 1803. The regiment laid siege to Aligarh Fort, a fort commanded by a French mercenary officer Pierre Perron and captured it from the Marathas. The French prepared for the siege by lining 14 ditches around the fort with sword-blades and poisoned chevaux-de-frise. The walls were reinforced with French artillery, and the French also used tigers and lions of Scindia's menagerie. During the battle, the British lost as many as 900 soldiers. The regiment went on to fight at the Battle of Delhi in September 1803, the Battle of Laswari in November 1803, and the Battle of Deeg in November 1804. For their distinguished service in these actions, King George III authorized the regiment to have the word "Hindoostan" emblazoned upon the regimental colours, along with an elephant badge with a howdah atop the elephant, also inscribed with the word "Hindoostan". The regiment returned to England and became the 76th (Hindoostan) Regiment of Foot in October 1806.

Napoleonic Wars

In 1807, the regiment was deployed to Jersey in the Channel Islands for garrison duty, remaining there until 1808, when it was deployed to Spain to take part in the Peninsular War. The regiment took part in the Battle of Corunna in January 1809 and was evacuated from the Peninsula later that month. The regiment took part in the disastrous Walcheren Campaign in autumn 1809 and, having reverted to the title of 76th Regiment of Foot in 1812, returned to the Peninsula in 1813 seeing action at the Battle of Nivelle in November 1813 and the Battle of the Nive in December 1813. It then embarked for North America for service in the War of 1812 and saw action at the Battle of Plattsburgh in September 1814.

The Victorian era

The regiment did not return from North America until 1827. It was garrisoned in Ireland until 1834 when it departed for the West Indies. It went to the Bermuda Garrison (part of the Nova Scotia Command until 1868, when Bermuda was made an independent command), and on to Canada in 1841 before returning home in 1842. The regiment were deployed to South Wales later in the year to help suppress the Rebecca Riots. After that the regiment went to Corfu in 1848 and on to Malta in 1850 before sailing for Saint John, New Brunswick in March 1853. It was garrisoned at Fredericton in New Brunswick before embarking for home again in September 1857. It embarked for India in September 1863 and was stationed in Fort St. George, Madras before moving on to Burma in January 1868, returning to India again in 1870 and sailing for England in 1876.

As part of the Cardwell Reforms of the 1870s, where single-battalion regiments were linked together to share a single depot and recruiting district in the United Kingdom, the 76th was linked with the 33rd (Duke of Wellington's) Regiment, and assigned to district no. 9 at Wellesley Barracks in Halifax. On 1 July 1881 the Childers Reforms came into effect and the regiment amalgamated with the 33rd (Duke of Wellington's) Regiment to form the Duke of Wellington's Regiment.

Battle honours
The regiment's battle honours were:

Hindoostan
Peninsular War: Nive, Peninsula

Colonels
Colonels of the Regiments were:
76th Regiment of Foot (1787) ;76th (Hindoostan) Regiment of Foot (1806)
1787–1812: Gen. Sir Thomas Musgrave, 7th Baronet
76th Regiment of Foot (1812)
1813–1814: Lt.-Gen. Sir George Prévost
1814–1834: Lt-Gen Christopher Chowne
1834–1836: Gen. Sir Peregrine Maitland, GCB 
1843: Lt-Gen. George Middlemore, CB 
1843–1853: Lt-Gen. Sir Robert Arbuthnot, KCB
1853–1862: Gen. William Jervois, KH
1862–1871: Lt-Gen. Joseph Clarke
1871–1875: Lt-Gen. Matthew Smith
1875–1881: Gen. Frederick Darley George, CB1881: Regiment amalgamated with 33rd (Duke of Wellington's) Regiment of Foot as the second battalion''

References

Sources

Further reading
 

76 Regiment of Foot
Regiments of the British Army in the American Revolutionary War
British military units and formations of the War of 1812
The Duke of Wellington's Regiment
Military units and formations established in 1787
Military units and formations disestablished in 1881
1787 establishments in Great Britain
1881 disestablishments in the United Kingdom